The 2020 Davidson Wildcats football team represented Davidson College in the 2020–21 NCAA Division I FCS football season. They were led by third-year head coach Scott Abell and played their home games at Richardson Stadium. They competed as a member of the Pioneer Football League.

Schedule
Davidson formally released their football schedule on June 1, 2020.

References

Davidson
Davidson Wildcats football seasons
Pioneer Football League champion seasons
Davidson
Davidson Wildcats football